Declana niveata is a species of moth in the family Geometridae. It is endemic to New Zealand. This species was first described by Arthur Gardiner Butler in 1879. The larvae of this species feed on Hoheria species.

References

Moths of New Zealand
Moths described in 1879
Endemic fauna of New Zealand
Ennominae
Taxa named by Arthur Gardiner Butler
Endemic moths of New Zealand